Wallace Ridge is an unincorporated community and census-designated place (CDP) in Catahoula Parish, Louisiana, United States. As of the 2010 census it had a population of 710. It is located northeast of the center of Catahoula Parish on the west side of the Ouachita River. Tew Lake, a former channel of the river that is now an oxbow lake, is in the northern part of the CDP, and Wallace Lake, another oxbow, borders the southern part. The original community of Wallace Ridge is on relatively higher ground on the north side of Tew Lake.

Louisiana State Highway 124 passes through Wallace Ridge, leading north  to Harrisonburg, the Catahoula Parish seat, and south  to Jonesville, the largest town in the parish.

Demographics

References

Census-designated places in Louisiana
Census-designated places in Catahoula Parish, Louisiana